The Rahway River Bridge is a rail bridge over the Rahway River, in Rahway, Union County, New Jersey, U.S., a few blocks north of Rahway station, on the Northeast Corridor (NEC).

The arch bridge was built circa 1915 by the Pennsylvania Railroad at the time it was widening and elevating the tracks on a viaduct on its mainline through New Jersey, a project that had been initiated in 1901.

The bridge carries the NEC and is located at MP 19.13 of the New York Division. It is used by Amtrak, including Northeast Regional and Keystone Service, and New Jersey Transit's Northeast Corridor Line and North Jersey Coast Line, which junction near Union Tower to the south.

The bridge was documented by the Historic American Engineering Record in 1977. It is part of the unlisted Pennsylvania Railroad New York to Philadelphia Historic District (ID#4568), designated in 2002 by the New Jersey State Historic Preservation Office.

See also
List of crossings of the Rahway River
List of NJT movable bridges
List of bridges documented by the Historic American Engineering Record in New Jersey
List of Northeast Corridor infrastructure
Perth Amboy and Woodbridge Railroad
Rahway River Parkway

References

External links

Amtrak bridges
Historic American Engineering Record in New Jersey
NJ Transit bridges
Rahway, New Jersey
Railroad bridges in New Jersey
Transportation in Union County, New Jersey
Bridges completed in 1915
1915 establishments in New Jersey
Pennsylvania Railroad bridges
Bridges in Union County, New Jersey
Rahway River